Eva Gräfin Finck von Finckenstein (née Schubring; 3 December 1903, in Berlin – 13 March 1994) was a German politician, representative of the German Christian Democratic Union.

Eva Schubring was born in Berlin to the art historian Professor Schubring. She visited school in Berlin and studied national economics at the University of Berlin. In 1928-33 she was the managing editor for foreign affairs of the Vossische Zeitung in Berlin. After the Nazis took over power in Germany she retreated from politics.

She was first married to screenwriter Ayi Tendulkar and after her divorce she married Gottfried Graf Finck von Finckenstein in 1934, with whom she had five children. After her marriage she lived in Terpen in East Prussia. At the end of World War II she fled to Schleswig-Holstein, where she published a journal "Die Hausfrau" (The housewife) in 1949/50. In 1950 she joined the League of Expellees and Deprived of Rights (BHE) and became the personal assistant of BHE Chairman Waldemar Kraft and the party's press referent. In 1953 she was elected a member of the German Bundestag.

In 1954 she was not reelected into the BHE board, which led to the resignation of Waldemar Kraft as BHE Chairman. In 1956 Kraft, Finckenstein and Theodor Oberländer joined the CDU Fraction, which led to the decline of influence of the BHE in German politics.

Finck von Finckenstein was not again elected to the Bundestag and retreated from politics.

See also
List of German Christian Democratic Union politicians

Notes

References

1903 births
1994 deaths
Politicians from Berlin
German Protestants
All-German Bloc/League of Expellees and Deprived of Rights politicians
Members of the Bundestag for Schleswig-Holstein
Female members of the Bundestag
20th-century German women politicians
Officers Crosses of the Order of Merit of the Federal Republic of Germany
Members of the Bundestag for the Christian Democratic Union of Germany